The 2015 North Carolina Tar Heels football team represented the University of North Carolina at Chapel Hill as a member of Coastal Division of the Atlantic Coast Conference (ACC) during the 2015 NCAA Division I FBS football season. The team was led by fourth-year head coach Larry Fedora and played their home games at Kenan Memorial Stadium. North Carolina finished the season 11–3 overall and 8–0 in ACC play to win the ACC Coastal Division title. They represented the Coastal Division in the ACC Championship Game, where they lost to Atlantic Division champion Clemson. They were invited to the Russell Athletic Bowl, where they lost to Baylor.

Recruiting
National Signing Day was on February 4, 2015 and was the first chance for high school seniors to officially declare which university or college they will be attending for their college career. North Carolina had 19 high school seniors sign a National Letter of Intent to play football with them. Of the class, 10 athletes enrolled early to UNC.

Coaching staff
North Carolina head coach Larry Fedora entered his fourth year as the North Carolina's head coach for the 2015 season. After ranking as one of the worst defenses in the country in 2014, Fedora completely revamped the Tar Heel defensive coaching staff.  Fedora hired Gene Chizik as the new defensive coordinator. Chizik was most recently the head coach at Auburn, where he led the Tigers to a national championship in 2011.  With the coaching change, UNC also switched from a 4-2-5 base defense to a 4–3 defense.  Other defensive coaching hires include John Papuchis, former defensive coordinator at Nebraska, as linebackers coach, Tray Scott as defensive line coach, and Charlton Warren as defensive backs coach.

Schedule

North Carolina is the only FBS team that played all of its 2015 regular-season games, both home and away, on grass fields.

Game summaries

vs. South Carolina

North Carolina A&T

Illinois

Delaware

at Georgia Tech

Wake Forest

Virginia

at Pittsburgh

Duke

Miami (FL)

at Virginia Tech

at NC State

vs Clemson

vs Baylor

Rankings

Postseason

All-Conference Selections

First Team

• Elijah Hood - Running Back

• Landon Turner - Guard

Second Team

• Marquise Williams - Quarterback

• Mack Hollins - Wide Receiver

• Jon Heck - Offensive Tackle

• Caleb Peterson - Guard

• M. J. Stewart - Cornerback

• Ryan Switzer - Specialist

Third Team

• Ryan Switzer - Wide Receiver

• Quinshad Davis - Wide Receiver

• Lucas Crowley - Center

• Nazair Jones - Defensive Tackle

• Shakeel Rashad - Linebacker

• Des Lawrence - Cornerback

All-American Selections

Landon Turner, Offensive Line (AP, Athlon)
Ryan Switzer, All-purpose / return specialist (AFCA)

NFL Draft
For the second year in a row, North Carolina did not have any players selected in the NFL Draft.

The following players signed as undrafted free agents:

References

North Carolina
North Carolina Tar Heels football seasons
North Carolina Tar Heels football